Monroe Township is the name of some places in the U.S. state of Pennsylvania:

Monroe Township, Bedford County, Pennsylvania
Monroe Township, Bradford County, Pennsylvania
Monroe Township, Clarion County, Pennsylvania
Monroe Township, Cumberland County, Pennsylvania
Monroe Township, Juniata County, Pennsylvania
Monroe Township, Snyder County, Pennsylvania
Monroe Township, Wyoming County, Pennsylvania

See also
 Monroe, Pennsylvania (disambiguation)

Pennsylvania township disambiguation pages